The siege of Medion was a siege carried out by the Aetolian League in 231 BC against the Ancient Greek city of Medion in Acarnania. The siege triggered an invasion by an Illyrian relief force and ended in the Battle of Medion with an Aetolian defeat.

Siege

Earlier in 231 BC, after the dissolution of the Epirote League, the Aetolian League had requested the city of Medion to join it, but the Acarnanians refused. The Aetolians decided to take Medion by force, beginning the siege in June. The king of Macedon Demetrius II Aetolicus, a rival of the Aetolian League, being himself engaged against the Dardanians, requested Agron of Illyria to intervene and help the Acarnanians. Agron accepted and sent a fleet of 100 lembi and 5,000 men to Medion. This was the largest force any Illyrian king had ever assembled. The Illyrians and Macedon were not necessarily allied, but the former was instead hired to assault the Aetolians at Medion as mercenaries for the latter.

A modern historian, Erich S. Gruen, says that the fact that Demetrius of Macedon had to call the Illyrians to relieve Medion shows that he was incapable of doing so himself. This is supported by another historian, Grainger, who says that Demetrius was preoccupied in northern Macedon in a war against Dardania. As the Illyrians were also at war against the Dardanians, Grainger states it made Agron and Demetrius 'allies'. Polybius, on the other hand, who wrote a contemporary report, simply states that Agron was bribed by Macedon to attack the Aetolians. Polybius possibly wrote this to enforce his previous and later statements that the Illyrians were pirates.

Battle
The Illyrians landed on the Acarnanian coast in September and marched to Medion to attack the Aetolian besiegers. The Aetolians reacted by sending their own light infantry and cavalry to a higher ground, but a single Illyrian charge, using their close formation and numbers to their advantage, forced the cavalry to retire to the Aetolian hoplites. From their higher ground the Illyrians then charged downwards on the combined Aetolian army, quickly routing them. When at last the Acarnanians from inside the city joined the attack, the Aetolians were defeated and lost many fighters.

Aftermath
After taking many prisoners and much booty, the Illyrians left Medion and sailed to Illyria. Upon their arrival, they reported their victory over the Aetolians to King Agron, in late 231 BC. He is said to have died shortly afterwards, due to his excessive victory celebrations. He was succeeded by his wife, Queen Teuta, the same year. It is assumed that after the Illyrians defeated the Aetolians at the siege, Medion and the rest of Acarnania allied with Illyria against the Aetolian League to protect the region from future attacks. This is evident as in the naval battle of Paxos, two years later, the Illyrian navy was enforced by ships from Acarnania.

References

Notes

231 BC
230s BC conflicts
Medion
Medion
Medion
Ancient Acarnania